The Sailfin cardinalfish (Quinca mirifica) is a species of ray-finned fish from the family Apogonidae, the cardinalfishes, and the only member of its genus. It is a large, almost all-black cardinal fish which is endemic to coral reefs in Western Australia. They are not yet common in the Aquarium trade, and are nocturnal.

References

Apogoninae
Fish described in 1966
Monotypic fish genera